John Silcock (15 January 1898 – 28 June 1966) was an English footballer, who played at left back, spending most of his career at Manchester United. He died in 1966, at the age of 68.

Club career
As a youth, Silcock played for Aspull Juniors and Atherton, before signing for Manchester United as a trainee in 1916. He started his professional career with them in 1919. He made 423 appearances, scoring 2 goals for the club, before leaving in 1934 for Oldham Athletic, where he remained until retiring as a player. He briefly came out of retirement in 1936, to play for Droylsden.

International career
Silcock won three caps for England between 1921 and 1923.

External links
MUFCInfo.com profile
AboutManUtd.com profile

1898 births
Footballers from Wigan
1966 deaths
English footballers
England international footballers
Manchester United F.C. players
Oldham Athletic A.F.C. players
English Football League players
English Football League representative players
Association football fullbacks
Droylsden F.C. players